Eubranchus yolandae is a species of sea slug or nudibranch, a marine gastropod mollusc in the family Eubranchidae.

Distribution
This species was described from 16 m depth at Los Arcos, Bahía de Banderas, Jalisco, Mexico, tropical eastern Pacific. It has only been reported from the type locality.

References

Eubranchidae
Gastropods described in 2007